Bob Cunningham (September 26, 1927 – October 8, 2006) was a Grey Cup champion and award-winning professional Canadian football fullback.

Career 
Between 1948 and 1951, he played 29 games for the Montreal Alouettes, scoring one touchdown in the 37th Grey Cup He played for the Ottawa Rough Riders from 1952 to 1955, winning the Jeff Russel Memorial Trophy in 1953 (as Eastern MVP). In 1947 he was an all-star with the Toronto Balmy Beach Beachers.

References 

1927 births
2006 deaths
Sportspeople from Mississauga
Montreal Alouettes players
Ottawa Rough Riders players
Canadian football fullbacks
Players of Canadian football from Ontario
Ontario Rugby Football Union players
Toronto Balmy Beach Beachers players